Jelšane is a village in the Municipality of Ilirska Bistrica in the Inner Carniola region of Slovenia, right on the border with Croatia. The Jelšane international border crossing between Slovenia and Croatia is just south of the village.

Mass graves
Jelšane is the site of six known mass graves or unmarked graves from the end of the Second World War. Most contain the remains of German soldiers from the 97th Corps that fell at the beginning of May 1945. The Cemetery Wall Mass Grave is located next to the west side of the cemetery wall and contains the remains of an unknown number of soldiers. The Kršnjak Mass Grave is located about 120 m east of the village cemetery and contains the remains of six prisoners of war. The Brežine Mass Grave, also known as the Lokva Mass Grave, is located on the east edge of the village and contains the remains of six prisoners of war. The Christmas Valley Grave is located in the woods east of the village and contains the remains of one soldier. The Branček Grave, also known as the Šušnjak Grave, is located on the south side of the road east of the village at a former lime kiln and contains the remains of one soldier. The Little Bridge Grave is located at the crossroads south of the settlement. It contains the remains of an Italian officer killed by German soldiers.

Church
The parish church in the settlement is dedicated to the Assumption of Mary and belongs to the Koper Diocese.

References

External links 
Jelšane on Geopedia

Populated places in the Municipality of Ilirska Bistrica
Lime kilns in Slovenia